The historic Buena Vista Hotel in Safford, Arizona was built in 1928 at cost of $80,000.  The 2-story, 46-room hotel was built by Fred and Minta Waughtal, who owned the nearby Olive Hotel, and opened Oct. 15, 1929. It featured swimming pool and two bars; the Tap Room, and the Matador Room, which both featured live music and entertainment, including jazz and country and western music. The hotel closed in 1979 and was damaged in a fire. The building was demolished in 1994.

It was listed on the National Register of Historic Places in 1988.

It is or was a two-story,  by  steel frame and stucco building designed by Henry O. Jaastad of Tucson and has been deemed to be the finest example of Mission Revival architecture in Safford.  It has a corbeled brick parapet. It is the only hotel in Safford surviving from its historic era.

Part of the interior of the building was damaged by fire in 1979.

The building no longer exists.

References

Safford, Arizona
Buildings and structures in Graham County, Arizona
Hotel buildings on the National Register of Historic Places in Arizona
Hotel buildings completed in 1928
1928 establishments in Arizona
National Register of Historic Places in Graham County, Arizona
Mission Revival architecture
Demolished buildings and structures in Arizona
Buildings and structures demolished in 1994
Demolished hotels in the United States